The Yangchun–Yangjianggang railway is a railway line in Yangjiang, Guangdong, China.

History
Construction began in September 1995. The line was fully opened on 28 June 2004.

Route
The line splits from the Guangzhou–Maoming railway at Yangchun and heads south, meeting the coast at Yangjiang Port.

References

Railway lines in China